Government Islamia College Civil Lines, formerly called Dayanand Anglo Vedic College, is a government college in Lahore, Punjab, Pakistan. Founded by Arya Samaj as the school of Dayanand Anglo Vedic on June 1, 1886, It was later renamed Dayanand Anglo Vedic (DAV) College after Hindu leader Dayananda Saraswati.

The college was nationalized by the Zulfiqar Ali Bhutto regime in 1972. It is operated by the Ministry of Education (Higher Wing), Government of Punjab, Pakistan.

History
The 'Islamia College, Civil Lines' in Lahore, Pakistan was founded in 1947 on the premises of the famous DAV (Dayanand Anglo Vedic) College which then shifted to D.A.V. College (Lahore) in Ambala, Haryana, India after partition. Graduates and students of this college are referred to as "Faranians". 

On 17th December, 1928. Bhagat Singh, Shivaram Rajguru and Sukhdev Thapar awaited at the entrance of this college for a plan to kill Superintendent of Police James A Scott. However, in a case of mistaken identity, the plotters shot John P. Saunders, an Assistant Superintendent of Police, as he was leaving the District Police Headquarters across the street, and ran towards Government College. 

Graduates and students of the college are referred to as "Habibians", named for the college's oldest and central building.

The college has rival competition with the Government College University, Lahore, known as "Ravians", in education and cricket teams.

Notable alumni

 Religious scholars
 Haji Abdulwahab, Religious scholar

 Politicians
 Sartaj Aziz, former Finance Minister of Pakistan
 Choudhary Rahmat Ali, the person who coined the name "Pakistan"
 Sardar Muhammad Ibrahim Khan, founder and first president of The Azad Kashmir
 Chaudhary Muhammad Ali, former Prime Minister of Pakistan
 Malik Meraj Khalid, former Prime Minister of Pakistan and former speaker of the National Assembly of Pakistan
 Moeen Qureshi, former interim Prime Minister of Pakistan
 Sheikh Mohammad Abdullah, former Prime Minister of Kashmir (India)
 Maulana Abdul Sattar Khan Niazi, religious scholar and politician
 Mian Manzoor Ahmad Wattoo, Federal Minister and former Chief Minister of Punjab
 Raja Zulqarnain, General Secretary Supreme Court Bar Association (SCBAP) 2009-2010
 Mian Mahmud Ali Kasuri, former Law Minister of Pakistan
 Mian Muhammad Aslam Iqbal, former provincial minister of Punjab

 Judiciary and government officials
 S. A. Rahman, former Chief Justice of the Supreme Court of Pakistan
 Muhammad Yaqub Ali, former Chief Justice of the Supreme Court of Pakistan
 Amir Alam Khan, former Judge of Lahore High Court
 Chaudhry Ijaz Ahmed, Justice of the Supreme Court of Pakistan
 Mian Mahmud Ali Kasuri, former Law Minister
 Tariq Majid, former Chairman, Joint Chiefs of Staff Committee, Pakistan Armed Forces
 Sheikh Riaz Ahmad, former Chief Justice
 Rashid Aziz Former Chief Justice of Lahore High Court]]
 Sports personalities
 Fazal Mahmood, former captain of Pakistan Cricket Team
 Abdul Hafeez Kardar, first captain of Pakistan Cricket Team
 Khan Mohammad, former test cricketer; took the first test wicket for Pakistan
 Imtiaz Ahmed, former captain of Pakistan Cricket Team
 Nazar Mohammad, former test cricketer, who scored the first century for Pakistan in test cricket
 Zameer Haider, international cricket umpire
 Gul Mohammad, former test cricketer, who represented India and Pakistan in test cricket
 Maqsood Ahmed, also known as Merry Max, former test cricketer
 Saeed Ahmed, former captain of Pakistan Cricket Team
 Asif Masood, former test cricketer
 Jahangir Khan, former squash player
 Wasim Akram, former captain of Pakistan cricket team
 Aleem Dar, international cricket umpire
 Aaqib Javed, former test cricketer and coach of Pakistan Team

 Khalid Mahmood, former captain of Pakistan Hockey Team
 Samiullah Khan, former captain of Pakistan Hockey Team
 Salim Sherwani, former captain of Pakistan hockey team
 Khawaja Zakauddin, former Olympian (hockey)
 Ashraf Ali, former test cricketer
 Asad Rauf, test umpire

Journalists
 Hameed Nizami, founder of the Urdu newspaper Nawa-i-Waqt
 Majid Nizami, editor-in-chief of Nawa-i-Waqt Group of Publication in Pakistan and a columnist
 Abdullah Malik, journalist and literary historian

Writers, poets and artists
 Qazi Abdur Rehman Amritsari poet and proposed name of Islamabad
 Majeed Amjad, Urdu poet
 Nasir Kazmi, Urdu poet
 Wasif Ali Wasif, Sufi author and poet
 Amjad Islam Amjad, poet and playwright
 Col. Muhammad  Khan, novelist, humorist
 Raja Mehdi Ali Khan a famous lyricist.
 Siddique Salik. writer
 Rafi Khawar Nanna, comedian of PTV and film 

Industry
 Feroz Nizami music composer.
 Riaz Shahid, writer and film director

See also
 Fatima Begum (politician) — helped establish the women's college in 1939

References

External links
Islamia College (Lahore) website

Government Islamia College
Educational institutions established in 1892
1892 establishments in India